Bounty Lady is a 2013 Hong Kong modern comedy-drama produced by TVB and starring Dayo Wong and Kate Tsui, with Sharon Chan, Louis Yuen, Benz Hui, Elena Kong, Grace Wong, Toby Leung, Sammy Sum, Samantha Ko and Lam Tsz-sin as the major supporting cast.

Synopsis
Public Relation expert Heung Kwong-Nam (pun, meaning "Hong Kong men") is a renowned saviour to the single ladies in town. He is able to help many single female clients find a happy marriage by building confidence. Without charging money, he is able to find purpose in helping these women find love and themselves.

Newly joined Account Officer Sing Fa-Lui (pun, meaning "unmarried woman") is hired by Mak Dik-Man as Kwong-Nam's rival. At first, she is an overly-confident girl that sees Kwong-Nam and his group (Super Senior) as lazy and good-for-nothing. But she eventually grows to see the good in Kwong-Nam and his methods and they end up falling love.

Plot summary
Episode 1-4:
Kwong-Nam is hired by Ha-Tim to help his daughter, Judy, find a good husband. Judy is a princess - rich, well-educated, and loyal but also overbearing and overweight. At the same time, Fa-Lui is also hired by Dik-Man to help Judy find a husband. Both attempt to help Judy lose weight in order to find herself a good husband but Fa-Lui's dieting tactics causes Judy to become hospitalized. Ha-Tim fires her but continues to work with Kwong-Nam. Judy finds a suitable man at a speed-dating encounter set up by Kwong-Nam and Joe becomes her ultimate target to losing weight. However, Joe only sees Judy as a potential real-estate client. He admits Judy is not a typical HK-like girl, being sweet and kind, but still overweight. Kwong-Nam helps Judy realize she has changed from the typical HK girl to a nice and lovable girl. At this time, he also opens her eyes to her secret-admirer, Ho Gar-Jun.

Episode 6-7:
Yam Mo-Lin is a tough female cop and devoted fan of Windy, completely following her ideology of living a single "full" life. Kwong-Nam runs into Mo-Lin at a lounge, playing drinking games. Intoxicated, Mo-Lin accidentally spills her secret admiration for a fellow co-worker at the police station, Wong Lung; however, Wong Lung always seems to treat Mo-Lin as one of the guys. So, Kwong-Nam decides to help Mo-Lin attract the man she loves, whilst breaking Mo-Lin away from Windy's ridiculous concept of a feminist society. Kwong-Nam is also able to attain help from Fa-Lui for this case because Fa-Lui has a bone to pick with Windy as well. After multiple attempts, Wong Lung still rejects Mo-Lin and Mo-Lin is about ready to give up on love. At Windy's meet-and-greet, Windy urges Mo-Lin to announce her new single life to the world but Kwong-Nam appears, convincing her to admit that she does still love Wong Lung. With Kwong-Nam's setup, all of Mo-Lin's lady-lessons were recorded and Wong Lung was able to witness it all at a private theater, with Mo-Lin. He sees her diligence and persistence on screen but also admits that he likes her the way she was before the lady lessons.

Episode 8-10:
Fa-Lui's mother, Lee Chiu-Ling, has always taught her daughters that the ultimate goal is to marry a rich man. However, Fa-Lui's younger sister, Sing Fa-Yui, has always been a ditsy airhead so Fa-Lui puts it on herself to look after her younger sister. In order to help her find a rich man, Fa-Lui sets up an interview for Fa-Yui to be an advertising model for their next client, media tycoon Ma Ming. Due to his clean public image, Fa-Lui marks Ma Ming as a good match for Fa-Yui, hence providing more encounters for Fa-Yui to be close to Ma Ming. However, Kwong-Nam discovers that Ma Ming is a fake and his true purpose for hiring Fa-Yui is to deflower this pure and innocent girl. Kwong-Nam is torn between his professionalism to his company's client and his hatred for Ma Ming's dirty schemes. Meanwhile, Fa-Yui realizes that she does not care about marrying a rich man because her heart was already stolen by her childhood sweetheart, Pak-Kin. Pak-Kin grew up with Fa-Yui and has always had a crush on her. He was willing to give up his lazy and carefree life to work multiple jobs to win Fa-Yui's family over. Kwong-Nam also shows Fa-Lui Ma Ming's true colors and that Fa-Yui and Pak-Kin are the perfect matches together. Fa-Yui makes Pak-Kin want to be a better person and Pak-Kin really cares for Fa-Yui.

Cast

Heung Family

Sing Family

Yuen Family

Tung Family

Other cast

Awards and nominations
TVB Anniversary Awards 2013
Won - Best Actor (Dayo Wong)
Won - Best Supporting Actor (Benz Hui)
Nominated - My Favourite Male Character (Dayo Wong)
Nominated - Best Actress (Top 5) (Kate Tsui)
Nominated - My Favourite Female Character (Kate Tsui)

Viewership Ratings & Reception
In total, Bounty Lady received 111 complaints, 35 were on Kate Tsui's little screentime, 37 complaints on Sharon Chan's poor acting and singing skills, too much screentime and inappropriate dressing. The final episode received 13 complaints about their poor editing. The drama also received complaints on draggy plot, misleading, degrades men/women, had too many advertisements and too much sex appeal, a bad influence on children. There were also 5 compliments on Kate Tsui and Sharon Chan's acting respectively.

References

 English Synopsis

External links
K-TVB.net English Synopsis, Themesong Lyric Translations and More

TVB dramas
2013 Hong Kong television series debuts
2013 Hong Kong television series endings